The 1972 Mysore State Legislative Assembly election was held in the Indian state of Mysore (currently Karnataka) to elect 216 members to the Mysore Legislative Assembly. Indian National Congress (Requisitionists) allied with Communist Party of India. D. Devaraj Urs of INC(R) and M. S. Krishnan of CPI came together and forged a pre-pol alliance.

Results 

!colspan=10|
|- align=center
!style="background-color:#E9E9E9" class="unsortable"|
!style="background-color:#E9E9E9" align=center|Political Party
!style="background-color:#E9E9E9" |Contestants
!style="background-color:#E9E9E9" |Seats won
!style="background-color:#E9E9E9" |Seat change
!style="background-color:#E9E9E9" |Votes
!style="background-color:#E9E9E9" |Vote share
!style="background-color:#E9E9E9" |Net change
|-style="background: #90EE90;"
| 
|align="left"|Indian National Congress (Requisitionists)||212||165|| 39||4,698,824||52.17%|| 3.74%
|-
| 
|align="left"|Indian National Congress (Organisation)||176||24||||2,361,308||26.22%|| 26.22%
|-
| 
|align="left"|Communist Party of India||4||3||||88,978||0.99%||
|-
| 
|align="left"|Samyukta Socialist Party||29||3|| 3||152,556||1.69%||  0.78%
|-
| 
|align="left"|Janata Paksha Party||2||1||||14,390||0.16%||
|-
| 
|align="left"|Independents||||20|| 21||1,159,383||12.87%||
|-
|align="left" colspan=2|Total||||216||||''''''||||
|-
|}

Elected members

References

Mysore
State Assembly elections in Karnataka
Government of Mysore